The Clarksdale Press Register is the weekly newspaper of Clarksdale, Mississippi. Newspaper coverage has extended to both Clarksdale and Coahoma County since 1865. The Press Register is published every Wednesday and has an audience of more than 7,750 readers. The Press Register is owned by Emmerich Newspapers, the Editor and Publisher is Floyd Ingram.

External links

Newspapers published in Mississippi
Clarksdale, Mississippi